Davis College (formerly Practical Bible College) is a private Baptist bible college in Johnson City, New York. It is affiliated with the Baptist Convention of New York and endorsed by the Baptist Convention of Pennsylvania/South Jersey.

History
Davis College was founded in April 1900 by evangelist Reverend John Adelbert Davis. Rev. Davis wanted to start a school similar to his alma mater, Moody Bible Institute, located in Chicago. He taught the first classes at what was then known as Practical Bible School with an enrollment of about 80 to 90 students. The school's first classes were held in an upper level of a store in Lestershire (Johnson City), New York. Davis College is now located at the former location of the White City Amusement Park. In 1910, the park went bankrupt, and Rev. Davis purchased the property. Practical Bible Training School moved to the address one year later. Davis died on Saturday, March 17, 1934. His oldest son, Gordon Carr Davis, became the president and Practical Bible Training School changed its legal name to the John A. Davis Memorial Bible School. In 1993, it was renamed Practical Bible College. In August 2004, the college became Davis College in honor of its founder John A. Davis.

Presidents
John R. Clements, 1900 – July 31, 1914
John Adelbert Davis, August 7, 1914 – March 17, 1934
Gordon Carr Davis, April 30, 1934 – December 7, 1961
Marion C. Patterson, December 11, 1961 – December 31, 1970
Kenneth C. Robb, January 1, 1971 – June 30, 1980
Woodrow M. Kroll, January 1, 1981 – May 31, 1990
Dale E. Linebaugh, July 1, 1991 – June 30, 1998
George D. Miller III, July 1, 1998 – June 30, 2008 
Dino J. Pedrone, July 1, 2008 – January 15, 2018 
George Snyder Jr., January 16, 2018 – January 17, 2019 (interim)
D. Alan Blanc Sr., January 18, 2019 – present (interim through September 24, 2021)

Academics

In 1993, the school was accredited by the State of New York and became Practical Bible College. Davis College was first regionally accredited in June 2005 by the Middle States Association of Colleges and Schools and accredited nationally by The Association for Biblical Higher Education in 1985.

Specialized ministry programs include Pastoral Studies, Youth Ministries, Teaching English as a Second Language, Christian Ministries, Intercultural Studies, Music and Worship, and Organizational Leadership.

The college also offers a "4 Plus 1" Elementary Education articulation agreement allowing graduates from the Christian Ministries program to pursue a MsEd in Childhood Education at a Christian university. This provides certification that is reciprocal in 48 states, including New York and Florida, allowing graduates to teach in both public and private schools. One year certificates are also offered in Bible and Teaching English as a Second Language.

In 2012, Davis College purchased Blessed Sacrament Church, which was heavily damaged by flooding in 2011. This acquisition provided the school with its first distinct chapel. In addition, the college hopes to renovate and utilize this property for offices, classrooms, guest speaker housing, and The Practical Institute.

References

External links
Official website

Association for Biblical Higher Education
Education in Broome County, New York
Companies based in Binghamton, New York
Organizations based in Binghamton, New York
1900 establishments in New York (state)
Seminaries and theological colleges in New York (state)
Educational institutions established in 1900
USCAA member institutions